The following table lists known estimated box office ticket sales for various high-grossing films that have sold at least  tickets worldwide.

Note that some of the data are incomplete due to a lack of available admissions data from a number of box office territories. Therefore, it is not an exhaustive list of all the highest-grossing films by ticket sales, so no rankings are given.

List

See also 
Lists of highest-grossing films
List of highest-grossing films
List of highest-grossing non-English films
List of animated films by box office admissions

Notes

References 

Lists of highest-grossing films